Horan is an Irish surname.

Horan may also refer to:

 Horan (singer) (Choi Soo-jin, born 1979), South Korean singer and actress
 Hauran, a region of Syria
 Ireland West Airport, formerly Horan International Airport

See also

Byeongja Horan or Pyongja Horan, the Qing invasion of Joseon
 Jeongmyo Horan, or the later Jin invasion of Joseon
Harvey v. Horan, an American 2001 federal court case